Swiss Cottage is an area of Hampstead in the London Borough of Camden, England. It is centred on the junction of Avenue Road and Finchley Road and includes Swiss Cottage tube station. The area was named after a public house in the centre of it, known as "Ye Olde Swiss Cottage".It was visited by Queen Victoria’s fourth child.

History

Toponymy 
According to the Dictionary of London Place Names (2001), the district is named after an inn called The Swiss Tavern that was built in 1804 in the style of a Swiss chalet on the site of a former tollgate keeper's cottage, and later renamed Swiss Inn and in the early 20th century Swiss Cottage.

Urban development 

The district formed part of the ancient parish of Hampstead. It developed following the Finchley Road Act 1826, which authorised construction of Finchley New Road and Avenue Road, with The Swiss Tavern built at the junction of the new roads. The neighbourhood around Finchley Road and Avenue Road was redeveloped in 1937 and 1938 with the opening of an Odeon cinema and the Regency Lodge flats. After World War II, local authority housing was constructed by the London County Council in the area. Council housing includes the five-tower Chalcots Estate built in the 1960s.

On 20 March 2014 a planning application was submitted for a 24-storey tower to be built next to Swiss Cottage tube station. The application was rejected by Camden Council on 11 September 2014 following mass local protests. A revised scheme received planning permission in 2016 but the developer, Essential Living, argued affordable housing requirements made the scheme uneconomic. After delaying construction for several years, it decided to start the originally approved building with construction expected to begin in 2023 and complete by 2025.

Government 
Swiss Cottage is in the Hampstead and Kilburn constituency, formed at the 2010 general election. It was formerly in the Hampstead and Highgate constituency, for which the MP was Glenda Jackson. It forms part of the Barnet and Camden London Assembly constituency. There is a Swiss Cottage electoral ward, electing councillors to Camden London Borough Council.

Geography 
Adjoining neighbourhoods include Hampstead Village to the northeast, Chalk Farm and Camden Town to the southeast, Belsize Park to the east, St John's Wood to the south and West Hampstead to the west. Regent's Park is within walking distance of Swiss Cottage (about 1.4 km).

It is bounded by five conservation areas; Belsize, Elsworthy, Fitzjohns-Netherhall, South Hampstead, St. John's Wood (Camden) and St. John's Wood (Westminster).

Swiss Cottage includes part of the NW3, NW6 and NW8 postal areas.

Demography 
According to the 2011 census, Swiss Cottage had a population of 12,900. 67% of the Swiss Cottage ward population was white (40% British, 25% Other, 2% Irish). 7% was Other Asian and 5% Indian. 33% were Christians, 24% irreligious, 11% Jewish and 10% Muslim.

Economy 
Swiss Cottage/Finchley Road is identified as a district centre in the London Plan and there are assorted shops the length of the Finchley Road. Local major hotels include Marriott Regents Park, Danubius Regents Park, and Hampstead Britannia Hotel. There are many smaller hotels in the area. Notable restaurants provide European, South-east Asian, and Japanese cuisine.

Transport 
The area is served by Swiss Cottage and Finchley Road tube stations on the Jubilee line of the London Underground and is a local hub for London Buses. The former Swiss Cottage station was opened by the Metropolitan Railway in 1868; the current station dates from 1939. South Hampstead railway station and Finchley Road & Frognal railway station on London Overground are also nearby.

Local bus routes are:
 13 – North Finchley to Victoria Station (24 hours daily) via Finchley Road, Marble Arch and Park Lane
 113 – Edgware to Oxford Circus via Finchley Road
 46 – St Bartholomew's Hospital to Lancaster Gate via King's Cross, Hampstead Village, Maida Vale, and Paddington
 31 – White City to Camden Town via Holland Park, Notting Hill Gate, Kilburn and Primrose Hill
 C11 – Brent Cross Shopping Centre to Archway via West Hampstead, Belsize Park, and Parliament Hill
 268 – Golders Green to Finchley Road via Hampstead Village and Belsize Park
 603 – Muswell Hill to terminate at Swiss Cottage via Hampstead Heath (school days only)
 187 – Finchley Road to Central Middlesex Hospital via Maida Vale, Queen's Park, Harlesden, and Park Royal
Night buses:
 13 – North Finchley to Victoria Station (24 hour Daily)
 N28 – Wandsworth to Camden Town via Kilburn, Notting Hill Gate, and Fulham.
 N31 – Clapham Junction to Camden Town via Kilburn, Notting Hill Gate, and Chelsea.
 N113 – Edgware to Trafalgar Square via Hendon Way, Finchley Road, and Oxford Street.

Culture 
Swiss Cottage is a cultural centre within Camden and north-west London. Local amenities include an Odeon IMAX Cinema, Sir Basil Spence's Grade II-listed Swiss Cottage Central Library and the Hampstead Theatre. Swiss Cottage is the location of the Royal Central School of Speech and Drama, resident at the Embassy Theatre on Eton Avenue. Swiss Cottage Leisure Centre reopened in early 2006 after redevelopment; it now has two swimming pools, a gym and a climbing wall. Many of the area's cityscapes and London street scenes, particularly of Swiss Cottage, Adamson Road, Eton Avenue and Belsize Park were represented by the Camden Town Group painter Robert Bevan and his wife, the Polish painter Stanisława de Karłowska. They lived at 14 Adamson Road and are commemorated with an English Heritage Blue Plaque.

Notable residents

Commemorative blue plaques

Robert Bevan (painter), 14 Adamson Road
Clara Butt (singer), 7 Harley Road

Other notable residents
Lillie Langtry (actress, socialite, and producer) lived in the area of Langtry Walk and was known to rendezvous nearby with Edward VII.

References

External links 
 Swiss Cottage School

 Swiss Cottage Leisure Centre

Swiss Cottage
Areas of London
Districts of the London Borough of Camden
Road junctions in London
District centres of London